Kirill Kozhevnikov (born 1926) was a Soviet sailor. He competed in the 6 Metre event at the 1952 Summer Olympics in Helsinki, Finland.

References

External links
 

1926 births
Possibly living people
Soviet male sailors (sport)
Olympic sailors of the Soviet Union
Sailors at the 1952 Summer Olympics – 6 Metre
Place of birth missing (living people)